Statutes in Force was the fourth revised edition of the statutes. Publication began in 1972. It was completed in 1981.

Statutes in Force continued to be updated until 1 February 1991. Work on revised material for Statutes in Force was suspended on account of the preparation of the Statute Law Database.

The length of Statutes in Force exceeded sixty thousand pages. Statutes in Force consisted of booklets or pamphlets or leaflets that were punched and inserted in ring binders. Statutes in Force has been described as a "loose booklet", "quasi loose leaf", "modified loose leaf" or "loose leaf" publication.

Glanville Williams said that Statutes in Force was defective in that it did not contain "proper" annotations to the statutes, but that he preferred it to Halsbury's Statutes because it did not break up the statutes between titles in the way, which he considered inconvenient, that Halsbury's Statutes did. Halsbury's Laws of England said that Statutes in Force was not "altogether successful".

In 1991, the editorial board of Statutes in Force was replaced by the Advisory Committee on Statute Law.

Statutes in Force is the source of the originating text of most of the revised content published on Legislation.gov.uk.

References
John E Pemberton, "Loose-Leaf Statutes" (1969) 71 Library World 72 (No 831, September 1969)
"Statutes in Force" in "Practice-Notes" (1969) 66 Law Society's Gazette 6
"Statutes in Force" (1969) 133 Justice of the Peace and Local Government Review 245 (12 April 1969)
"Statute Book: Statutes in force-Official Revised Edition" (1969) 88 Law Notes 49 (February 1969)
"Statutes in Force" in "Legal Notes" (1972) 76 The Accountant's Magazine 451 (September 1972)
"Statutes in Force" (1973) 10 The Legal Executive 201 (July 1973)
"The Statute Law Database and Statutes in Force: the current position", Refer: Journal of the RSIS, vols 10-12, p 8
H W Leader, "Some Aspects of Government Legal Publications" (1972) 3 The Law Librarian 4 at 4, 5, and 7 (No 1, April-July 1972). See also Derek J Way, "Book Selection", 4 The Law Librarian 25 at 27; vols 2-7, "Statutes in Force" at p 48, "Book reviews" at p 45. Google Books
"A Book of Law that the Citizens can Understand" (1972) 4 Review of Ghana Law 181
[1983] Malayan Law Journal lxx (February 1983) Google Books
The Library Association (1968) Proceedings of the 16th Annual Conference and Study Group 64 Google Books
Campbell, Glasson and Lahore. "Statutes in Force: Official Revised Edition". Legal Research: Materials and Methods. Second Edition. Law Book Company Limited. 1979. Page 96. Campbell, Glasson, York and Sharpe. Third Edition. 1988. Page 110.
Yogis and Christie. "(ii) Statutes in Force (1972 to date)" Legal Writing and Research Manual. Third Edition by Michael J Iosipescu. Butterworths. Toronto and Vancouver. 1988. Page 15. Fifth Edition by Michael J Iosipescu and Michael E Deturbide. Butterworths. 2000. Page 19.
Adrian Blunt. "Statutes in force". Law Librarianship. (Outlines of Modern Librarianship). Clive Bingley Ltd, a member of K G Saur International Publishing Group. 1980. Page 23.
Frank Rogers. "Statutes in force. Official revised edition. 1972-". A Guide to British Government Publications. H W Wilson Company. New York. 1980. Page 151. See also pages 138, 152, 159 and 160.
"Statutes in Force". The Preparation of Legislation: Report of a Committee Appointed by the Lord President of the Council. Cmnd 6053. Paragraph 5.21 at page 23. Sessional Papers. Volume 12: Parliamentary Papers Sessional Papers.

External links

Law books